St. Thomas's Episcopal Church is a parish church of the Episcopal Church located in New Haven, Connecticut. Founded in 1848, the original English Gothic church was completed in 1855 on Elm Street, on the site of a temporary chapel the parish built in 1849. St. Thomas moved to its present site on Whitney Avenue in 1939.

History 
On February 24, 1848, a meeting was held by sixteen lay Episcopalians in New Haven, Connecticut, to discuss the opening of a third Episcopal church in the city. The first services were held in a room that belonged to Center Church on April 23, 1848, where they remained until 1849. The rector purchased a lot on Elm Street that year, and began construction of a temporary chapel. Five months later, the first services were held in the chapel on August 12, 1849. The congregation decided that a new, larger church would be built on the site of the existing chapel, and the last services in the chapel were held on March 12, 1854. One month later, the cornerstone of the new church was laid, with Bishop John Williams in attendance. In the meantime, services were held in Brewster Hall. The completed church was consecrated on April 19, 1855. It was constructed in the English Gothic Revival style out of Portland stone. A parish house was not built until 1888. The cornerstone was laid on May 21, and the building was dedicated on February 3, 1889.

In 1923, the rector proposed that the church relocate to another part of New Haven, as since the founding of the church, Elm Street had become entirely commercial. The congregation purchased a lot on Whitney Avenue, between Odgen and Cliff Streets in 1923. There, a new parish house was constructed in 1931. A new church was constructed there, and consecrated on October 8, 1939.

References

Citations

Sources

External links 

Churches in New Haven, Connecticut
Episcopal church buildings in Connecticut
Religious organizations established in 1848
1848 establishments in Connecticut